Harvey Uhlenhopp (June 23, 1915 – May 22, 1986) was a justice of the Iowa Supreme Court from  March 10, 1970, until his death, appointed from Franklin County, Iowa.

References

Justices of the Iowa Supreme Court
1915 births
1986 deaths
20th-century American judges